Crambus nivellus is a moth of the family Crambidae. It is found in India, including Uttar Pradesh, Darjeeling and the Nilgiri Mountains.

References

Crambini
Moths described in 1844
Moths of Asia